N-acetyltransferase 9 is an enzyme that in humans is encoded by the NAT9 gene.

References

Further reading

Human proteins